A Map of the World is a 1999 album by Pat Metheny. It is the soundtrack of the movie A Map of the World released in 1999 starring Sigourney Weaver. The movie was based on the novel A Map of the World by Jane Hamilton.

Track listing
All music composed and arranged by Pat Metheny

Personnel 
 Pat Metheny – acoustic guitars, piano, keyboards
 Gil Goldstein – orchestrator, conductor,  organ
 Steve Rodby – acoustic bass
 Dave Samuels – percussion

Orchestra
 Virgil Blackwell – bass clarinet
 Richard Locker – cello (as leader)
 John Moses, Paul Garment, Steven Hartman – clarinet
 William Blount – clarinet (as leader)
 John Feeney – double bass (basses, as leader)
 Brian Cassier, Jay Elfenbein, John Kulowitsch, Lewis Paer – double bass (basses)
 Melanie Feld – English horn
 Sheryl Henze – flute 
 Elizabeth Mann – flute (as leader)
 Victoria Drake – harp 
 Sara Cutler – harp (as leader) 
 Robert Carlisle, David Wakefield, Joseph Anderer, Scott Temple – horns 
 Stewart Rose – horns (as leader)
 Gordon Gottlieb – percussion (orchestral, as leader) 
 Barry Centanni, Maya Gunji – percussion (orchestral)
 Alexander Rees, Ann Roggen, David Cerutti, Jill Jaffe, Liuh-Wen Ting, Lois Martin, Nicole Brockman, Ronald Lawrence, Ronald Carbone – viola
 Louise Schulman – viola (as leader)
 Anca Nicolau, Bruno Eicher, Curtis Macomber, Fritz Krakowski, Gregor Kitzis, Karl Kawahara, Krista Bennion Feeney, Mara Milkis, Marilyn Reynolds, Masako Yanagita, Mayuki Fukuhara, Mineko Yajima, Mitsuru Tsubota, Natasha Lipkina, Rebecca Muir, Rob Shaw, Robin Bushman, Sara Schwartz – violin
 Eriko Sato – violin, concertmaster

Production
 Produced by Pat Metheny and Steve Rodby 
 Recorded and mixed by Rob Eaton
 Mastered by Ted Jensen at Sterling Sound, New York City, USA

External links 
 Information site on the official page of Pat Metheny

References 

Pat Metheny albums
1999 soundtrack albums
Drama film soundtracks